This list of toys and children's media awards is an index to articles about notable awards related to toys and other products such as books and videos for children.

See also

 Lists of awards
 List of media awards
 List of comics awards
 Toy

References

 
Children's media and toys